Henning Munk Jensen (born 12 January 1947) is a Danish former footballer who played as a defender. He most prominently played professionally for Dutch team PSV Eindhoven, as well as 392 games for AaB in Denmark during the 1960s. He was named 1968 and 1975 Danish Football Player of the Year, and played a record-setting 62 matches for the Denmark national team from 1966 to 1978, 24 of these as team captain.

He is the brother-in-law of Danish international Allan Michaelsen, and thus the uncle of Danish international Jan Michaelsen.

Club career
Munk Jensen started his career in the youth teams of Aalborg clubs Aalborg Chang and Aalborg FC, before moving to Aalborg BK (AaB). He started his footballing career as a right winger, but eventually settled as a tall, strong, and fast central defender. He made his senior debut in 1965, and got his national breakthrough in AaB's games against English team Everton in the 1966–67 European Cup Winners' Cup. He was injured when AaB won the 1966 Danish Cup, but was on the losing end when AaB lost the 1967 final. He missed AaB's victorious 1970 Danish Cup final through suspension.

In 1970, he moved abroad to play professionally with Dutch club PSV Eindhoven, having been recommended to the club by Danish international and PSV player Bent Schmidt-Hansen. He stayed with PSV for three seasons, before moving back to rejoin AaB in 1973. When AaB introduced professional wages, the management planned to pay all players the same amount, which prompted Munk Jensen and goalkeeper Karsten Simensen to leave the club. In early 1978, he moved from AaB to nearby team Frederikshavn fI in the Danish 2nd Division. He moved abroad once more to play for North American clubs Edmonton Drillers and San Jose Earthquakes in 1979. He returned to AaB in 1979, played a single year with Aalborg Freja in the 3rd Division, before he ended his career with AaB in the 2nd Division in 1981. He set an AaB club record with a total 392 games, a record which was eventually broken by Torben Boye.

International career
Munk Jensen made his international debut with the Denmark U19 national team in June 1964, and played eight under-19 games until July 1965. He also played two games for the Denmark U21 in 1966. In November 1966, he made his debut with the senior national team under manager Poul Petersen. He did not play his second international match until June 1968, but then established himself in the starting line-up, and was named 1968 Danish Football Player of the Year. He played a further 22 games for Denmark until June 1970. When he signed a professional contract with PSV, he was prohibited from representing the amateur-only national team.

After the rule of amateurism was abolished in 1971, Munk Jensen re-entered the Danish team in June 1972, and played a further four games that year. Not until he returned for his second stint with AaB, did he re-capture his place in the Danish starting line-up. He played his 28th game for Denmark in September 1974, and was appointed national team captain in September 1975. He was named 1975 Danish Football Player of the Year, the first player to win the award twice, and captained Denmark in 24 of his last 28 national team games. He played full-time in all but one of his national team games, as he was substituted off the pitch in his 50th game, having played awfully in a 2–1 defeat to Poland. In May 1978, he broke Bent Hansen's record of 58 games for Denmark. He ended his international career in September 1978, having played a Danish record 62 international games. The record was broken by Per Røntved in August 1981.

Honours
Individual
Danish Football Player of the Year: 1968, 1975

References

External links

 AaB profile
 Haslund.info profile

1947 births
Living people
Sportspeople from Aalborg
People from Tønder Municipality
Danish men's footballers
Association football defenders
Denmark international footballers
Denmark under-21 international footballers
Eredivisie players
North American Soccer League (1968–1984) players
AaB Fodbold players
PSV Eindhoven players
Frederikshavn fI players
San Jose Earthquakes (1974–1988) players
Edmonton Drillers (1979–1982) players
Danish expatriate men's footballers
Danish expatriate sportspeople in the Netherlands
Expatriate footballers in the Netherlands
Danish expatriate sportspeople in the United States
Expatriate soccer players in the United States
Danish expatriate sportspeople in Canada
Expatriate soccer players in Canada